Spyros Chatzis (born 24 August 1977) is a Greek former professional footballer who played as a midfielder.

References

1977 births
Living people
Greek footballers
Apollon Smyrnis F.C. players
A.P.O. Akratitos Ano Liosia players
Niki Volos F.C. players
Anagennisi Arta F.C. players
Panetolikos F.C. players
Thyella Patras F.C. players
Panachaiki F.C. players
Panegialios F.C. players
Association football midfielders
Super League Greece players
People from Rhodes
Sportspeople from the South Aegean